The 2020–21 Big Ten women's basketball season began with practices in October 2020, followed by the start of the 2020–21 NCAA Division I women's basketball season in November 2020. The regular season will end in March, 2021.

The Big Ten tournament will be played at Bankers Life Fieldhouse in Indianapolis, Indiana in March 2021.

Head coaches

Coaches

Notes: 
 All records, appearances, titles, etc. are from time with current school only. 
 Year at school includes 2020–21 season.
 Overall and Big Ten records are from time at current school and are through the beginning of the season. 
 Frese's ACC conference record excluded since Maryland began Big Ten Conference play in 2014–15.
 Stringer's Big East and American conference record excluded since Rutgers began Big Ten Conference play in 2014–15.

Preseason

Preseason conference poll 
The Big Ten released the preseason ranking on November 11, 2020 which featured a ranking by both media and coaches.

Preseason national polls

Regular season

Rankings

Honors and awards

All-Big Ten awards and teams
On March 8, 2021, the Big Ten announced its conference awards.

References